Joakim Kemell (born 27 April 2004) is a Finnish professional ice hockey forward who is currently playing with the Milwaukee Admirals in the American Hockey League (AHL) as a prospect to the Nashville Predators of the National Hockey League (NHL). He was touted as one of the top Finnish prospects, and was drafted 17th overall by the Predators in 2022 NHL Entry Draft.

Playing career
Kemell scored 15 goals and 23 points through 39 regular season games, playing in his first full year with JYP Jyväskylä in the Liiga of the 2021–22 season. At the conclusion of the season, Kemell won the Jarmo Wasama Memorial Trophy as Finish Liiga's Rookie of the Year.

Following his selection at the 2022 NHL Entry Draft, Kemell was signed to a three-year, entry-level contract with the Nashville Predators on 15 July 2022. He was returned on loan by the Predators to continue his development in Finalnd with JYP Jyväskylä for the 2022–23 season.

International play

Kemell represented Finland at the 2022 IIHF World U18 Championships, where he recorded six goals and two assists and won a bronze medal.

Career statistics

Regular season and playoffs

International

Awards and honors

References

External links
 

2004 births
Living people
Finnish ice hockey right wingers
JYP Jyväskylä players
Ice hockey players at the 2020 Winter Youth Olympics
Milwaukee Admirals players
Nashville Predators draft picks
National Hockey League first-round draft picks
21st-century Finnish people